Chrono may refer to:

Prefix
chrono- a Greek combining form relating to time
chronometry,  science of the measurement of time
"chrono", colloquialism for chronograph in watch and clock collectors' language

Games
Chrono (series), a Japanese video game series, which includes:
Chrono Trigger
Radical Dreamers
Chrono Cross
Crono (Chrono Trigger), the main character in Chrono Trigger

Books
Chrono, a character in the Kurt Vonnegut novel The Sirens of Titan
Chrono, the title character from the manga and anime Chrono Crusade
Chrono Harlaown, from list of Magical Girl Lyrical Nanoha characters
Chrono Press, one of myriad imprints of the German group OmniScriptum devoted to the reproduction of Wikipedia content

Music
Chrono, a 2011 EP by Paul Kalkbrenner
"Chrono", a song by The Ghost Inside from the 2010 album Returners
"Chrono", a song by Kraftwerk from the 2003 album Tour de France Soundtracks

See also
Chronos
Chronos (disambiguation)